"Cold Summer" is the second single released from Fuel's album Puppet Strings.
The song dates back to the early 2000s (decade) before the band's 2003 album Natural Selection. According to Scallions the band had recorded the song several times and lost hope in it until producer Eddie Wohl convinced Scallions to record it for Puppet Strings.

Track listing 
Song composed by Brett Scallions and Eddie Wohl. Ken Schalk is credited to performing drums on this track, however, left the band before the release of Puppet Strings.

Music video
A music video was filmed in Agoura Hills, CA and features Scallions as a pool boy who stumbles in to a party.

Personnel
Brett Scallions - lead vocals, rhythm guitar
Andy Andersson - lead guitar
Brad Stewart - bass 
Ken Schalk - drums

Charts

References

Fuel (band) songs
2014 songs
2014 singles